The Sowol Poetry Prize is one of the most prestigious literary awards in South Korea. Established by the publishing company Moonhaksasangsa in 1986, the prize aims to commemorate the soul of the poetry of Kim Sowol.

The awardees are selected through a two-round process. During the first round various published poems are chosen and evaluated by a selected university professors, poets, literary critics, and editors-in-chief of Literary Thought (the literary magazine published by Moonhaksasangsa); readers of the magazine are also polled on their opinions. The selected entries then progress to the second round, in which ten works of poetry are ultimately chosen through rigorous discussion by the judges; the author of the winning poem will receive the grand prize, while the remaining nine poems are listed as runners-up. Every year Moonhaksasangsa publishes a collection of that year's winning poems.

Winners
List of recipients and the poem titles in chronological order.

References

South Korean literary awards
Poetry awards
Awards established in 1986